Cicogna is an Italian surname meaning "stork". Notable people with the surname include:

Emmanuele Antonio Cicogna (1789–1868), Italian writer, scholar and book collector
Giorgio Rosso Cicogna (born 1945), Italian diplomat
Marina Cicogna (born 1934), Italian film producer and photographer
Pasquale Cicogna, Doge of Venice

Italian-language surnames